Roger Harry Stuewer (September 12, 1934 – July 28, 2022) was an American historian of physics.

Education and career
Stuewer was born in Shawano, Wisconsin on September 12, 1934.

Stuewer received from the University of Wisconsin–Madison in 1958 a B.S. in physics education, in 1964 an M.S. in physics, and in 1968 a Ph.D. in the history of science and physics. In the 1958–1959 academic year, he taught high school physics and mathematics in Germantown, Wisconsin. From 1960 to 1962 he was an instructor in physics at Heidelberg College in Tiffin, Ohio. At the University of Minnesota, he was an assistant professor from 1967 to 1970 and an associate professor in 1970–1971. For the academic year 1971–1972 he was an associate professor in the history of science at Boston University. At the University of Minnesota, Stuewer was an associate professor from 1972–1974 and a full professor from 1974 until his retirement as professor emeritus in 2000. He was a visiting professor at the universities of Munich (1981–1982), Vienna (1989), Graz (1989), and Amsterdam (1998). He was a co-founder of the journal Physics in Perspective and was its co-editor-in-chief from 1997 to 2013.

Stuewer died in his home in New Brighton on July 28, 2022, aged 87.

Awards and honors
 1974–1975 & 1983–1984 Fellow of the American Council of Learned Societies
 1983 Fellow of the American Association for the Advancement of Science
 1990 University of Minnesota's George Taylor Distinguished Service Award
 1991 Fellow of the American Physical Society
 2013 Abraham Pais Prize for History of Physics
 2014 Fellow of the American Association of Physics Teachers

Selected publications

Books
 Historical and Philosophical Perspectives of Science, ed. (Minneapolis: University of Minnesota Press, 1970); reprinted in Roger Hahn, ed., Classics in the History and Philosophy of Science, Vol. I (New York: Gordon and Breach, 1989). 
 The Compton Effect: Turning Point in Physics (New York: Science History Publications, 1975). 
 Nuclear Physics in Retrospect: Proceedings of a Symposium on the 1930s, ed. (Minneapolis: University of Minnesota Press, 1979). 
 Springs of Scientific Creativity, ed. with R. Aris and H. T. Davis (Minneapolis: University of Minnesota Press, 1983). 
 The Michelson Era in American Science 1870-1930, ed. with Stanley Goldberg (New York: American Institute of Physics [AIP Conference Proceedings 179], 1988). 
 The Invention of Physical Science: Intersections of Mathematics, Theology and Natural Philosophy since the Seventeenth Century. Essays in Honor of Erwin N. Hiebert, ed. with Mary Jo Nye and Joan L. Richards (Dordrecht: Kluwer, 1992). 2012 ebook 
 The Emergence of Modern Physics: Proceedings of a Conference Commemorating a Century of Physics, Berlin 22-24 March 1995, ed. with Dieter Hoffmann and Fabio Bevilacqua (Pavia: Università degli Studi di Pavia, 1996). 
 The Physical Tourist: A Science Guide for the Traveler, ed. with John S. Rigden (Basel, Boston, Berlin: Birkhäuser Verlag, 2009). 
 The Age of Innocence: Nuclear Physics between the First and Second World Wars (Oxford, UK & New York: Oxford University Press, 2018)

Articles and book chapters
 1970 
 1971 
 1983 
 1985 
 1985 
 1994 
 2006

References

External links
 Roger H. Stuewer at the School of Physics & Astronomy 

Historians of science
University of Wisconsin–Madison alumni
University of Minnesota faculty
Fellows of the American Physical Society
1934 births
2022 deaths
People from Shawano, Wisconsin
Fellows of the American Association for the Advancement of Science